The 55th Light Combined Arms Brigade, formerly the 55th Division, is a military formation of the People's Liberation Army Ground Force of the People's Republic of China. It is now one of six combined arms brigades of the PLA 77th Group Army.

The 55th Division was created in May 1949 under the Regulation of the Redesignations of All Organizations and Units of the Army, issued by Central Military Commission on November 1, 1948, basing on the 12th Brigade of Shannan Military District. Its history could be traced to 24th Brigade, 8th Column of Jinjiluyu Field Army, formed on December 5, 1945. The first division commander is Fu Xianhui (符先辉）and the first political commissar is Zhang Ming (张明).

The division is part of 19th Corps. Under the flag of 55th division it took part in several major battles in the Chinese Civil War.

In July 1952 the division was put under direct control of the Northwestern Military Region following 19th Corps' disbandment.

In 1953 the division was reorganized and renamed as the 55th Infantry Division. By then the division was composed of:
163rd Infantry Regiment;
164th Infantry Regiment;
165th Infantry Regiment (former 169th Regiment of the disbanding 57th Division);
306th Artillery Regiment (former 165th Regiment).

In April 1960 the division was renamed as the 55th Army Division.

In October 1962 the division took part in the Sino-Indian War. During the war it inflicted 920 casualties to the Indian Army.

In October 1969 the division was transferred to the newly formed 19th Army Corps' control. 306th Artillery Regiment was renamed as Artillery Regiment, 55th Army Division.

In October 1985 the division was transferred to the 21st Army following 19th Army Corps' disbandment. At the same time the division was renamed as the 55th Motorized Infantry Division.

In 1985 Reconnaissance Company, 55th Division took part in recon missions during the Sino-Vietnamese War. During the war it inflicted 120 casualties to PAVN forces, without anyone killed or injured.

From 1985 to 1989 the division maintained as a test-bed Light Motorized Infantry Division: 
163rd Infantry Regiment was transferred to 63rd Infantry Division;
3rd Battalion, 163rd Infantry returned to the division, and 1st Battalion, 164th Infantry and 3rd Battalion, 165th Infantry was transferred to 163rd Infantry Regiment.
HQ, 164th and 165th Infantry Regiment were disbanded;
The division was then composed of 5 remaining infantry battalion, an artillery regiment and an antiaircraft battalion;
Each infantry battalion was composed of 2 rifle companies (peacetime, during the war there might be 3), 1 antiaircraft machine-gun company, 1 105-mm recoilless rifle battery and 1 107-mm rocket artillery battery.

The test organization seemed not successful, and in August 1989 the division re-organized as a Northern Motorized Infantry Division, Catalogue B: all three infantry regiments reactivated. By the division was composed of:
163rd Motorized Infantry Regiment;
164th Motorized Infantry Regiment;
165th Motorized Infantry Regiment;
Artillery Regiment.

In October 1998 the division was reduced brigade-sized and renamed as the 55th Motorized Infantry Brigade.

In 2003 the brigade was transferred to the 47th Army.

In 2017 the brigade was reorganized as the 55th Light Combined Arms Brigade and transferred to the 77th Group Army following 47th's disbandment.

References 

 中国人民解放军各步兵师沿革，http://blog.sina.com.cn/s/blog_a3f74a990101cp1q.html
 解放军第55师简史, https://web.archive.org/web/20160916013725/http://blog.sina.com.cn/s/blog_686c13540102vcnu.html

 《大授衔》欧阳青 下卷 第二野战军主力师及其著名少将 《党史博览》 2015年3期转载 http://blog.sina.com.cn/s/blog_a3f74a990101cp1q.html

Infantry brigades of the People's Liberation Army
Military units and formations established in 1949